Marbella Lighthouse (Spanish: Faro de Marbella) is a lighthouse in Marbella, southern Spain.

It is automatic and electric, its light controlled by photoelectric cells.

See also 

 List of lighthouses in Spain

References

External links 

 Comisión de faros

Lighthouses completed in 1864
Lighthouse
Lighthouses in Andalusia